Irakli Okruashvili (born 6 November 1973) is a Georgian politician who had served on various important posts in the Government of Georgia under President Mikheil Saakashvili, including being the Minister of Defense from December 2004 until being dismissed in November 2006.

In September 2007, Okruashvili staged a scandalous comeback to Georgian politics, openly confronting Mikheil Saakashvili and creating the opposition party Movement for United Georgia. On September 27, 2007, Okruashvili was briefly arrested at his party headquarters on the charges of corruption, money laundering, and abuse of office. In 2007 he left Georgia and was granted political asylum in France. He was sentenced to 11-year prison term in Georgia in absentia in March 2008. In October 2010, he, remaining in France, joined Sozar Subari, Levan Gachechiladze and Erosi Kitsmarishvili in the new Georgian Party.

Okruashvili was sentenced to five years in prison for allegedly participating in group violence in anti-government rallies organized in June 2019. However, President Salome Zourabichvili pardoned him, alongside Gigi Ugulava, on May 15, 2020.

On March 8, 2022 the Ukrainian Ministry of Defence stated that Okruashvili had arrived in Ukraine, together with other Georgian volunteers, in order to fight against the 2022 Russian invasion of Ukraine.

Political career 

Irakli Okruashvili was born in Tskhinvali, South Ossetian AO, Georgian SSR. He graduated from Faculty of International Law and Relations at Tbilisi State University. He then worked as an attorney.

In government

Okruashvili served as the Deputy Minister of Justice from 2000 to 2001. He joined Mikhail Saakashvili's United National Movement and was elected as a member of Tbilisi Assembly (Sakrebulo) in 2002. After the Rose Revolution, Okruashvili was appointed the Person Authorized (governor) of the president of Georgia in Shida Kartli (to which breakaway South Ossetia was a de jure part) in November 2003 and established strong anti-corruption and anti-smuggling measures in the region.

He served as the Prosecutor General from January 2004 until Saakashvili appointed him Interior Minister in June 2004 and moved him to the post of defence minister in December 2004. During his tenure as defence minister, Okruashvili was known for advocating military actions against the separatists in South Ossetia.

Okruashvili said on May 1, 2006, that he would resign if Georgia failed to restore control over breakaway South Ossetian by January 1, 2007.

On November 10, 2006, Saakashvili appointed him Minister for Economic Development. Davit Kezerashvili became the Minister of Defence. Okruashvili resigned as Minister for Economic Development on 17 November 2006.

In opposition

On September 25, 2007, he announced the formation of the new opposition Movement for United Georgia and unleashed criticism on President Saakashvili, accusing him of corruption, incompetency and human rights violations. He also raised new concerns around Zurab Zhvania's death, challenging the official investigation point of view and personally accused the Georgian president in planning the murder of businessman Badri Patarkatsishvili.

Speculations about Okruashvili's planned party had been circulating for a long time already and many commentators expected, what they called, "a war of compromising materials" in case of Okruashvili's political comeback. The presentation was preceded by the controversies over financial irregularities surrounding the party's new office and the arrest of Mikheil Kareli, Orkuashvili's close associate and governor of Shida Kartli, on the charges of corruption.

Arrest 
On September 27, 2007, Okruashvili was detained on charges of extortion, money laundering, and abuse of office while Georgia's defense minister. On September 28, 2007, several opposition parties organized a peaceful mass rally in Okruashvili's support at the Parliament of Georgia.

On October 8, 2007, in a video taped confession released by the General Prosecutor's Office, Okruashvili pleaded guilty to large-scale bribery through extortion and negligence while serving as minister and retracted his accusations against the president, winning release on bail of 10 million Georgian lari. He also said that his earlier accusations levelled against Saakashvili were not true and were aimed at gaining political dividends for himself and Badri Patarkatsishvili and at discrediting the President of Georgia. Some opposition leaders said Okruashvili's statement had been made under duress. Okruashvili declared, however, that he had decided to cooperate with the investigation in order to "mitigate [his] situation".

Expulsion from Georgia 

After he pleaded guilty, Okruashvili was released. Okruashvili left Georgia around November 1, 2007. He subsequently said he was forced into exile; the government said he had asked to leave because of medical issues.

On November 5, 2007, Okruashvili made a surprise appearance on Imedi TV from Munich, claiming that he had been forced to retract accusations against President Saakashvili while being in jail. A Georgian prosecuting officer, however, rejected Okruashvili's allegations, while the senior members of the Parliament of Georgia for the ruling party described him "an instrument in the hands of Patarkatsishvili", the owner of Imedi TV, who financed opposition rallies against the Georgian government.

On November 14, 2007, following a Prosecutor's Office request, a court in Tbilisi ruled that Okruashvili be returned to police custody pending investigation. In December 2007, he was arrested in Germany at the request of Georgia, but was later transferred to France, where a court ruled that he be freed on bail with Georgia's extradition request to be examined on April 16, 2008. In the meantime, a Georgian court found him guilty of "large-scale extortion" and sentenced him to 11 years in prison in absentia on March 28, 2008. On April 23, 2008, he was granted political asylum. The French courts ultimately rejected the extradition request as well.

In September 2008 Reuters reported Okruashvili had said that Saakashvili had long planned the 2008 South Ossetia war but had executed it poorly. While defence minister from 2004 to 2006 he and Saakashvili worked together on military plans to retake South Ossetia and Abkhazia, saying "Abkhazia was our strategic priority, but we drew up military plans in 2005 for taking both Abkhazia and South Ossetia as well".

In October 2010, Okruashvili resigned his position in the Movement for United Georgia and shortly afterwards joined with the high-profile Georgia-based politicians — Sozar Subari, Levan Gachechiladze, and Erosi Kitsmarishvili to establish a new opposition party, the Georgian Party.

Return, imprisonment and release
In a phone interview with the Tbilisi-based Maestro TV on May 22, 2011, he said "On May 25 I will be in Georgia together with my people. I will not talk about details. On May 25 we will manage to put an end to Saakashvili's regime with minimal losses. If there is a great public support, the losses will be minimal. So, everybody should acknowledge the responsibility, which should be assumed before our country."

After government change in Georgia Okruashvili, who faces multiple criminal charges in Georgia, returned from his French exile back to his home country. But despite a broad amnesty for political prisoners he was arrested upon arrival in the Tbilisi airport on November 20, 2012. Georgian Justice Minister, Tea Tsulukiani, commented, that she shared the view that Okruashvili "was subjected to politically-motivated persecution by the [previous] authorities." "But it does not automatically mean that he is innocent in those criminal charges that he may face; it requires investigation," Tsulukiani told journalists. "There are number of criminal charges brought against him and the most recent one is related to setting up of illegal armed groups and that is related to the events of May, 2011 [during street protest rallies]. It requires further probe and I think that Okruashvili returned in order to prove his truth." Irakli Okruashvili was released from a courtroom on January 11. His release was made possible after Okruashvili was cleared of bribe-taking and extortion charges during a hearing in the Court of Appeals on January 10 and after the Tbilisi City Court accepted on January 11 a motion from prosecutors to release Okruashvili from custody on GEL 15,000 bail. A trial into negligence will be continued later in the Tbilisi City Court.

After his release Okruashvili gave an interview to Reuters to define the reasons of his return to Georgia after several years of residence in France under political asylum. Okruashvili sayd Georgia's prosecution does not use him as "a golden witness" against President Saakashvili, as it was suggested in the Georgian media, and there was no big agreement with the new government about any issue. "My return (to the country) was just based on my decision and that`s it", Okruashvili said.

See also 
 List of people granted political asylum

References

External links
 Biography: Irakli Kobaevich Okruashvili, Kavkaz-uzel, January 14, 2013 (in Russian)

1973 births
Jurists from Georgia (country)
Living people
Georgian exiles
People from Tskhinvali
United National Movement (Georgia) politicians
Government ministers of Georgia (country)
People convicted in absentia
Expatriates from Georgia (country) in France
International Legion of Territorial Defense of Ukraine personnel
Foreign volunteers in the 2022 Russian invasion of Ukraine